Live at Montmartre is an album by American saxophonist Jackie McLean recorded at the Jazzhus Montmartre in 1972 and released on the SteepleChase label.

Reception
The Allmusic review by Scott Yanow awarded the album 4 stars and stated "Although not as advanced as some of his Blue Note classics of the 1960s, McLean is in top form and quite explorative during these performances; his sound is certainly instantly recognizable".

Track listing
All compositions by Jackie McLean except where noted.
 "Smile" (Charlie Chaplin) - 15:31
 "Das Dat" - 16:37 
 "Parker's Mood" (Charlie Parker) - 19:21
 "Confirmation" (Parker) - 9:30 Bonus track on CD reissue
 "Closing" - 0:23

Personnel
Jackie McLean – alto saxophone
Kenny Drew – piano
Bo Stief – bass
Alex Riel – drums

References

SteepleChase Records live albums
Jackie McLean live albums
1972 live albums
Albums recorded at Jazzhus Montmartre